Monmouth township is located in the extreme southeast corner of Shawnee County, Kansas.  There are currently no incorporated cities in Monmouth Township. Berryton is the largest unincorporated community. At the beginning of the 21st century it contains a post office, Berryton Elementary School (part of USD 450), and two churches: Berryton United Methodist and Berryton Baptist.
Until the construction of Clinton Reservoir the incorporated city of Richland was in the southeast corner of the township. An attempt was made to relocate some of the business of Richland a mile and a half north to become Richland Corners, but when the site of the dam was moved downstream a few miles Richland Corners was stranded too far from open water to benefit from the move. All the businesses eventually died. Originally intended to be under a few feet of water the townsite now a true ghost town. One can drive a few of the streets and walk the cement slab floor of the elementary school all the while speculating about what was once there.
In addition to maintaining roads the township authority cares for the cemeteries in the township.

Townships in Shawnee County, Kansas
Townships in Kansas